Fuentebella is a surname. Notable people with the surname include:

Arnulf Bryan Fuentebella (born 1976), Filipino politician
Arnulfo Fuentebella (1945–2020), Filipino politician
Evelyn Fuentebella (born 1945), Filipino politician
Felix Fuentebella (1915–2000), Filipino politician
Felix William Fuentebella (born 1975), Filipino politician
José Fuentebella (1883–1982), Filipino politician
Manuel Fuentebella (1889–1955), Filipino politician
Mariano Fuentebella (died 1916), Filipino politician